is the fourth single by the Japanese girl idol group Shiritsu Ebisu Chugaku (or fifth counting one cover single), released in Japan on July 27, 2011 on the indie label Stardust Digital.

History 
The single debuted at the 12th position in the Oricon Daily Singles Chart. In the Oricon Weekly Singles Chart, it peaked at number 59.

Members 
Mizuki, Reina Miyazaki, Rika Mayama, Natsu Anno, Ayaka Yasumoto, Aika Hirota, Mirei Hoshina, Hirono Suzuki, Rina Matsuno, Hinata Kashiwagi

Track listing

Charts

References

External links 
 Releases - Oh My Ghost? (Watashi ga Akuryō ni Natte mo) - Shiritsu Ebisu Chugaku official site
 Oh My Ghost? (Watashi ga Akuryō ni Natte mo) - HMV Online

Shiritsu Ebisu Chugaku songs
2011 singles
Japanese-language songs
Songs written by Kenichi Maeyamada